Summer Idyll (German: Sommeridylle) is a 1916 Austrian silent drama film directed by Jacob Fleck and Luise Fleck and starring Liane Haid, Hermann Benke and Max Neufeld.

Cast
 Margarete Thumann
 Liane Haid
 Hermann Benke
 Hans Rhoden
 Karl Baumgartner
 Otto Kreisler
 Max Neufeld
 Hermann Romberg

References

Bibliography
 Parish, Robert. Film Actors Guide. Scarecrow Press, 1977.

External links

Austro-Hungarian films
1916 films
Austrian silent feature films
Austrian drama films
Films directed by Jacob Fleck
Films directed by Luise Fleck
Austrian black-and-white films
1916 drama films
Silent drama films